Linden may refer to:

Trees
 Tilia (also known as lime and basswood Basswood), a genus
 American linden, a common name for Tilia americana
 Large-leaved linden, a common name for Tilia platyphyllos
 Little-leaf linden, a common name for Tilia cordata
 Silver linden, a common name for Tilia tomentosa 
 Viburnum linden, a common name for Viburnum dilatatum

Places

Australia
 Linden, New South Wales, a village in the Blue Mountains
 Linden, Queensland, a rural locality
 Linden, Western Australia, a ghost town in the goldfields of Western Australia

Canada
 Linden, Alberta, a village
 Linden, Nova Scotia

Germany
  Linden, Hanover, a quarter in the district of Hanover, Lower Saxony
 Linden, Hesse, a town in the district of Gießen, Hessen
 Linden, Kaiserslautern, a municipality in the district of Kaiserslautern, Rhineland-Palatinate
 Linden, Schleswig-Holstein, a municipality in the district Dithmarschen, Schleswig-Holstein
 Linden, Westerwaldkreis, a municipality in the district Westerwaldkreis, Rhineland-Palatinate

United States

 Linden, Alabama, a city and county seat
 Linden, Arizona, an unincorporated community
 Linden, California, a census-designated place
 Linden, Idaho, an unincorporated community
 Linden, Indiana, a town
 Linden, Iowa, a city
 Linden, Michigan, a city
 Linden Township, Brown County, Minnesota
 Linden, Minnesota, an unincorporated community
 Linden, Atchison County, Missouri, an unincorporated community
 Linden, Christian County, Missouri, an unincorporated community
 Linden, New Jersey, a city
 Linden, North Carolina, a town
 Linden (Columbus, Ohio), a neighborhood in Columbus
 Linden, Pennsylvania, a village in Woodward Township, Lycoming County, Pennsylvania
 Linden, Tennessee, a town and county seat
 Linden, Texas, a city and county seat
 Linden, Virginia, an unincorporated community
 Linden, Wise County, Virginia, an unincorporated community
 Linden, West Virginia, an unincorporated community
 Linden (town), Wisconsin, a town
 Linden, Wisconsin, a village within the town

Elsewhere
 Linden, Belgium, a town in the municipality of Lubbeek, Flemish Brabant
 Linden, Guyana, the second largest city in Guyana
 Linden, Netherlands, a village in North Brabant
 Linden, New Zealand, a suburb of Wellington
 Linden, Gauteng, a suburb of Johannesburg
 Linden, Switzerland, a municipality in the canton of Bern

Historic houses
 Linden (Glen Allan, Mississippi)
 Linden (Natchez, Mississippi)
 Linden (Champlain, Virginia)
 Linden Place, Bristol, Rhode Island

People
 Linden (given name)
 Linden (surname)
 Lindén, a Swedish surname

Ships
 USS Linden, a Union Navy steamer which served in the American Civil War
 ST Linden, a Kenyan tugboat

Transportation

United States
 Linden (CTA), a rapid transit station in Wilmette, Illinois
 Linden Depot, a historic railroad station in Linden, Indiana, on the National Register of Historic Places
 Linden Airport, a general aviation airport near Linden, New Jersey
 Linden station (NJ Transit), a commuter rail station in Linden, New Jersey
 Linden Circle, a traffic circle in Linden, New Jersey
 Linden Boulevard, in the boroughs of Brooklyn and Queens in New York City, New York

Elsewhere
 Linden railway station, New South Wales, Australia
 Linden railway station, Wellington, New Zealand

Other uses
 Linden High School (disambiguation)
 Linden Lab, creators of the online virtual world Second Life
 Linden Dollar, the virtual currency used in Second Life

See also
 Lin Dan (born 1983), Chinese badminton player
 Linden Hall (disambiguation)
 Linden House (disambiguation)
 Linden Lodge School, London
 Linden Oak, a white oak in Bethesda, Maryland
 Linden Park (disambiguation), several places
 Linden Square, a historic place in Brookline, Massachusetts
 Lindon (disambiguation)
 Lynden (disambiguation)
 Lyndon (disambiguation)
 The Lindens (disambiguation)